Tékes is a village in Hegyhát District, northern Baranya county, in the Southern Transdanubia region of Hungary. Its population at the 2011 census was 248.

Geography 
It is part of the Southern Transdanubia statistical region, and administratively it falls under Baranya County and then Hegyhát District.

Demographics

2011 census 
As of the census of 2011, there were 248 residents, 90 households, and 69 families living in the village. The average household size was 2.66. The average number of children was 1.26. The average family size was 3.01.

Religious affiliation was 51.5% Roman Catholic, 0.4% Calvinist, 6.3% Lutheran, 1.3% other and 23.8% unaffiliated, with 16.7% declining to answer.

The village had a significant ethnic minority Roma population of 21.8%. There were also small numbers of Germans (1.7%) and Poles (0.4%). The vast majority declared themselves as Hungarian (95.4%), with 4.6% declining to answer.

Local government 
The village is governed by a mayor with a four-person council. The local government of the village operates a joint council office with the nearby localities of Ág, Gerényes, Kisvaszar, Tarrós and Vásárosdombó. The seat of the joint council is in Vásárosdombó.

As of the election of 2019, the village also has a local minority self-government for its Roma community, with three elected representatives.

Transportation

Railway 
 Vásárosdombó Train Station,  to the west of the village. The station is on the Pusztaszabolcs–Pécs and Dombóvár-Komló railway lines and is operated by MÁV.

Attractions
 Lutheran Church
 Roman Catholic Church

Notes

External links
 OpenStreetMap
 Detailed Gazetteer of Hungary

References

Populated places in Baranya County